Nanjiao Township is a township situated in the northern part of Fangshan District, Beijing, China. It borders Fozizhuang Town in the north, Zhoukoudian Town in the southeast, and Xiayunling Township in the southwest. The township was home to 3,190 residents in 2020.

The name Nanjiao is taken from the township's location within a cellar-shaped basin.

History

Administrative Divisions 

In 2021, Nanjiao Township was constituted by 8 villages. All of them are listed in the table below:

See also 
 List of township-level divisions of Beijing

References 

Fangshan District
Township-level divisions of Beijing